Purple Blue is the third album by the Canadian indie band Eric's Trip. The album marked a turn to a heavier, more psychedelic sound, which Rick White would further explore with Elevator.

A tribute to the album can be found in the song "Eric Sleeps," by Australian indie band Youth Group, from their debut album Urban and Eastern.

Critical reception
Trouser Press wrote: "An assured slip of a record that favors full-on distorted rocketry over airy folk-pop and dinky minimalism, Purple Blue merely lacks the tunes that would defer tedium."

Track listing
 "Introduction Into The..., Pt. 1-4"  – 8:13
 a) "Hurt II"
 b) "Grammy"
 c) "Rib Bones"
 d) "Purple Blue"
 "Hourly"  – 2:47
 "Sixteen Hours"  – 3:05
 "Universe"  – 3:08
 "Eyes Shut"  – 1:37
 "Alone and Annoyed"  – 2:12
 "Lighthouse"  – 2:09
 "Spaceship Opening"  – 2:18
 "Universal Dawn"  – 3:32
 "One Floor Below"  – 1:40
 "Now a Friend"  – 1:54
 "Soon, Coming Closer"  – 3:37
 "Not Yours"  – 2:26
 "Sun Coming Up"  – 2:20
 "Beach"  – 4:14

Personnel
Julie Doiron - bass
Mark Gaudet - drums
Chris Thompson - guitar
Rick White - guitar, vocals

References

1996 albums
Eric's Trip albums
Sub Pop albums